Paternity Leave is a 2015 romantic comedy film directed by Matt Riddlehoover and starring Jacob York, Charlie David,  and Chris Salvatore. Principal photography of the film began on September 1, 2014, in Nashville, Tennessee. It made its world premiere at the Nashville Film Festival on April 19, 2015.

Premise 
A man finds out that he's pregnant with his partner's baby. Dumbstruck by the news, their relationship takes twists and turns through hardship and hilarity.

References

External links 
 
 Paternity Leave - Official Website

2015 films
2015 LGBT-related films
LGBT-related romantic comedy films
American LGBT-related films
American pregnancy films
2015 romantic comedy films
Gay-related films
Films directed by Matt Riddlehoover
Films shot in Tennessee
2010s English-language films
2010s American films